Shilong District is a district of the city of Pingdingshan, Henan, China.

Administrative divisions
As 2012, this district is divided to 4 subdistricts.
Subdistricts

References

County-level divisions of Henan
Pingdingshan